Hum is a small mountain located south of Mostar, Bosnia and Herzegovina, on the left bank of the Neretva river, part of the Čvrsnica region of the Dinaric Alps.

References

Mountains of Bosnia and Herzegovina
Herzegovina-Neretva Canton